Livability.com is a website that ranks the most livable small and mid-sized cities in the United States. The website includes demographic information, statistics, articles, photography and video that summarize the quality of life in cities, including information about schools, neighborhoods, local restaurants, and cultural events. The website's content is anchored by original photography shot by Journal Communications Inc. staff photographers. The site also provides moving tools and tips, do-it-yourself project help and home and garden advice.

Principals
Livability.com is owned and operated by Journal Communications, based in Franklin, Tennessee, a publisher over 100 custom magazines for chambers of commerce, economic development agencies and corporations, (such as the Tennessee Farm Bureau Federation).

Services

Livability.com publishes lists of small- to medium-sized US cities, such as "Best Affordable Places to Live," "Top 10 Best Places to Retire," and "10 Best Cities for Families."

References

Further reading

 
 
 
 

American review websites
American blogs